The UK Compilation Chart is a record chart based on sales of multi artist compilation albums in the United Kingdom. It is compiled weekly by the Official Charts Company (OCC), and each week's Top 40 is published online on the official websites of the OCC (Top 100), BBC Radio 1 and MTV, and in the magazines Music Week (Top 20) and UKChartsPlus (Top 50).

Though only accredited to compiling multi-artist compilation albums, the chart compiles all full-length various artist releases, not only when it involves a traditional compilation album of old recordings, but even when it's an original studio album by "various artists", whereby all the recordings are new. This is the case for example in motion picture soundtrack albums.

History
TV-advertised hits compilations had been established in the United Kingdom since K-Tel's 20 Dynamic Hits in 1972, but following the December 1983 release of the first album in the Now That's What I Call Music series, compilation albums featuring various artists reached a new level of popularity in the UK during the mid to late 1980s. As a result of their dominance over the UK Albums Chart, releases from various artists were excluded from the main UK album chart from 14 January 1989. Instead, they were compiled in the newly created UK Compilation Chart. This meant albums such as Now That's What I Call Music! 13 and The Hits Album 9, which had charted into the main Albums chart, had to be transferred into the compilations chart as they were still selling strong.

See also
List of best-selling compilation albums by year in the United Kingdom
List of UK Compilation Chart number ones

References

External links
Compilation Albums Top 40 at the Official Charts Company
The Official UK Compilation Chart at MTV
UK Top 40 Compilation Albums at BBC Radio 1

British record charts